The women's barefoot three event competition in water skiing at the 2009 World Games took place from 22 to 26 July 2009 at the Lotus Lake in Kaohsiung, Taiwan.

Competition format
A total of 10 athletes (one of them competed only in preliminaries of slalom and tricks) entered the competition. In this competition athletes compete in three events: slalom, tricks and jump. Best 9 athletes from preliminary round qualifies to the final.

Results

Preliminary

Final

References

External links
 Results on IWGA website

Water skiing at the 2009 World Games